Lucas Pittinari (born 30 November 1991) is an Argentine footballer, who plays as a defensive midfielder for Temperley.

Career
Lucas Pittinari began his career in the youth system of Belgrano in 2007. He made his first team debut on 2 October 2010 in a 3–0 victory over Independiente Rivadavia and was a member of the squad that gained promotion to the Argentine Primera División in 2011. On 16 September 2012 Pittinari scored his first goal for Belgrano in a 2–0 victory over Arsenal de Sarandi.

In January 2015, Pittinari joined the Major League Soccer club Colorado Rapids on a season-long loan, with a $1.5 million option to buy. In February 2020, Pittinari signed for Slovenian top division side Tabor Sežana.

Pittinari returned to Argentina after the spell in Slovenia, and joined Temperley in March 2021.

References

External links

 

1991 births
Living people
Sportspeople from Córdoba Province, Argentina
Argentine footballers
Argentine expatriate footballers
Association football midfielders
Club Atlético Belgrano footballers
Colorado Rapids players
Club Atlético Tigre footballers
Atlético de Rafaela footballers
Deportes La Serena footballers
Club Atlético Temperley footballers
Argentine Primera División players
Primera Nacional players
Major League Soccer players
Slovenian PrvaLiga players
Argentine expatriate sportspeople in the United States
Expatriate soccer players in the United States
Argentine expatriate sportspeople in Chile
Expatriate footballers in Chile
Argentine expatriate sportspeople in Slovenia
Expatriate footballers in Slovenia